Thomas Fallon (1825–1885) was an Irish-born, Canadian-raised American capitalist and politician, the mayor of San Jose, California.

Thomas Fallon may also refer to:
 Thomas H. Fallon (1942–2010), American lawyer, mayor of Malden, Massachusetts
 Thomas Timothy Fallon (1837–1916), Irish-born American Civil War soldier